Abraham Lewysohn (6 December 1805 – 14 February 1860) was a Hebraist and rabbi of Peiskretscham, Upper Silesia. He left a large number of manuscripts, several hundred sermons in Hebrew and Danish, novellæ on the Talmud, verses, a German work on Hebrew grammar, and a work titled Dorot Tannaim wa-Amoraim, a history of the Tannaim and Amoraim, the introduction to which, titled "Parnasat chakme ha-Talmud," was published in Kobak's Jeschurun (i, part 3, p. 81).

Publications
Me'ore Minhagim (Berlin, 1846), a critical essay on religious customs according to the Talmud, Posekim, and Midrashim (this work was afterward plagiarized by Finkelstein, Vienna, 1851);
Shete Derashot (Gleiwitz, 1856), sermons;
Toledot R. Yehoshua' ben Ḥananyah, biography of R. Joshua b. Hananiah (in Keller's Bikkurim, 1865);
Toledot Rab, biography of Rab or Abba Arika (Kobak's Jeschurun, vi and vii). Lewysohn was also a regular contributor to Ha-Maggid and to Klein's Jahrbuch.

References 
 
 Ludwig Lewysohn, in Ha-Maggid, vii.364;
 William Zeitlin, Bibl. Post-Mendels, pp. 208–209.

1805 births
1860 deaths
19th-century German rabbis
German Hebraists
Silesian Jews
People from the Province of Silesia
People from Pyskowice
German male non-fiction writers